Daisyfield railway station was a railway station that served the  Daisyfield area of Blackburn, Lancashire.

History
The station was opened by the Lancashire & Yorkshire Railway in 1872  and closed by British Railways in 1958. When the line was reopened as far as Clitheroe in 1994, Daisyfield remained closed; however the station signal box is still in operation to supervise the adjacent level crossing.

It also acts as a fringe box to Preston power signal box, controlling the line towards Clitheroe and the single line via slotted signals, requiring both the signalman at Preston and Daisyfield, to give a release before a train can use the single line. The disused platforms are still visible from passing trains.

Former Services

References
Welch, S. Lancashire Steam Finale, 

Disused railway stations in Blackburn with Darwen
Buildings and structures in Blackburn
Former Lancashire and Yorkshire Railway stations
Railway stations in Great Britain opened in 1872
Railway stations in Great Britain closed in 1958